Uropterygius supraforatus is a moray eel found in coral reefs in the Pacific and Indian Oceans. It is commonly known as the many-toothed snake moray, or the toothy snakemoray.

References

supraforatus
Fish described in 1909